Psychrobacter piscatorii is a Gram-negative, catalase- and oxidase-positive, psychrotolerant, nonmotile bacterium of the genus Psychrobacter, which was isolated from a fish-processing plant. The temperature  where Psychrobacter piscatorii was isolated was about 8 °C.

References

External links
Type strain of Psychrobacter piscatorii at BacDive -  the Bacterial Diversity Metadatabase

Moraxellaceae
Bacteria described in 2010